John Duffy (September 6, 1905 – September 27, 1984 in Woburn, Massachusetts) was a former U.S. soccer full back. Duffy played five years in the American Soccer League and earned two caps with the U.S. national team in 1928.

American Soccer League
In 1925, Duffy signed with the Philadelphia Field Club of the American Soccer League.  He spent two seasons in Philadelphia before moving to the Newark Skeeters for the 1927-1928 season.  In 1928, the Skeeters were suspended from the ASL and moved to the Eastern Professional Soccer League.  In 1929, Duffy moved to the New York Nationals.  In 1930, the Nationals were renamed the New York Giants.  Duffy began the fall 1930 season with the Giants before playing three games with the Brooklyn Wanderers and finished the fall with one game with the New York Soccer Club.

National team
Duffy earned two caps with the U.S. national team.  The first came at the 1928 Summer Olympics when the U.S. lost to Argentina 11-2.  Following this loss, the U.S. tied Poland, 3-3, on June 10, 1928.

References

1905 births
1984 deaths
American soccer players
Footballers at the 1928 Summer Olympics
Olympic soccer players of the United States
United States men's international soccer players
American Soccer League (1921–1933) players
Philadelphia Field Club players
Eastern Professional Soccer League (1928–29) players
Newark Skeeters players
New York Nationals (ASL) players
New York Giants (soccer, 1930–1932) players
Brooklyn Wanderers players
New York Soccer Club players
Association football defenders